Don Gramenz is an American former professional soccer player who played as a defender for Minnesota Thunder for eleven seasons, being named to the club's Hall of Fame. Gramenz played collegiately at the University of Wisconsin–Milwaukee, where he was a team captain. In 2008, he served as the interim manager of the Minnesota Thunder, succeeding Amos Magee. Gramenz move into teaching after his soccer career and worked as an elementary school teacher for 11 years before eventually moving into a role as an elementary school principal in Bloomington, Minnesota.

References

1971 births
Living people
American soccer coaches
American soccer players
Minnesota Thunder players
Tampa Bay Mutiny players
Minnesota Thunder coaches
Milwaukee Panthers men's soccer players
A-League (1995–2004) players
Major League Soccer players
Chicago Fire FC draft picks
Soccer players from Minnesota
People from Cottage Grove, Minnesota
Association football defenders